Dhania (or Dhaniya) is clan  or gotra of Chamars found in, Rajasthan,  Haryana, Punjab and Uttar Pradesh, India. They were involved in agriculture activities before Indian independence. Most owned land for farming.
 
Dhania are playing crucial role in social empowerment in their villages making Chamars proud.

Distribution

Haryana
Villages in Bhiwani district with Dhania population include: 
 Tosham
 Dulheri
 Baliali
 Dharwan Bass 
 Devsar
 Riwasa
 Nigana
 Buwani Khera
 Khanak
 Ratera
 Tosham
 Badhada
 Charkhi-Dadri
 Sandwa
 Siwani
 Nehrugarh
 guryani
 chahra
 Kural Bass
 Kharkadi
 Kirawad
 Petwar
 Bairan (Loharu)
Villages in Charkhi Dadri District with Dhania population include: 
 Pandwan
 Haroda Kalan

Villages in Hissar District with Dhania population include: 
 Hansi
 Mangali Jhara
 Nanheri Kalan
 Ladwa
 Mirzapur
 Parbhuwala
 Azadnagar

Villages in Sirsa District with Dhania population include: 
 Dhukra

Villages in Fatehabad District with Dhania population include: 
 Jand wala Bager

Villages in Jind district with Dhania population include:
 Julana
 Malar Safidon
 Surbara
 Uchana
 Ludana
 Muwana
Villages in Rohtak district with Dhania population include:
 Kalanaur
 Dattaur

Villages in Panipat district with Dhania population include:
 Atta, Samalkha

Villages in Kaithal district with Dhania population include:
 Chuhar Majra
 Siwan
 Balu
 Badsikari
 Taragarh
 Badsikari Kalan
 Songal
 Pundri
 Nagal

Villages in Karnal district with Dhania population include:
 Ghogripur

Villages in Sonipat district with Dhania population include:
 Kathura
 Purkhas
 Gohana. 

Villages in Kurukshtra district with Dhania population include:
 Shahbad Markanda
 Bijarpur
 Bhagthala
          
Village in Mahendarghar District  With Dhania population include 
 Dhani Bathotha

Village in Jhajjar Distt. With Dhania population include 
 Kablana

Rajasthan
Villages in Jhunjhunun district with Dhania population include: 
 Bissau
 Jasrapur
Villages in Alwar district with Dhania population include: 
 Khohar

Villages in Churu district with Dhania population include: 
 Dhani Badi
 Ratanpura
 Manpura
 Bairasar Chhota
 Dhani Kulriyan Taranagar
Villages in Sikar district with Dhania population include: 
 Rulyani

References 

 The religious life of India: The Chamars
 Chamar Leaders: B.R. Ambedkar; Jagjivan Ram; Kanshi Ram; Mayawati; Ashok Tanwar, Chandra Shekhar 'Rawan'

Gotras